Diadegma blackburni, also known as Diadegma hawaiiense, is a wasp first described by Cameron in 1883.
No subspecies are listed.

References

blackburni
Insects described in 1883